The Samuel B. Lee House, also known as Maplewood,  is a house in Duplex, in the U.S. state of Tennessee that was listed on the National Register of Historic Places in 1988.

The eligibility of the property for NRHP listing was addressed in a 1988 study of Williamson County historical resources.

The boundary increase listing mentions five contributing buildings, one contributing site, and two contributing structures.

References

Houses completed in 1819
Farms on the National Register of Historic Places in Tennessee
Houses in Williamson County, Tennessee
Central-passage houses in Tennessee
Houses completed in 1930
Greek Revival houses in Tennessee
National Register of Historic Places in Williamson County, Tennessee